Álvaro Amaro is a Portuguese politician of the Social Democratic Party (PSD) currently serving as a Member of the European Parliament.

Amaro has been a Member of the European Parliament since the 2019 European elections. In parliament, he has since been serving on the Committee on Agriculture and Rural Development. In addition to his committee assignments, he is part of the parliament's delegation to the ACP–EU Joint Parliamentary Assembly.

As of July 2021, Amaro is awaiting trial on charges of malfeasance and fraud in obtaining public funds, his parliamentary immunity having been previously suspended in February.

References

Living people
MEPs for Portugal 2019–2024
Social Democratic Party (Portugal) MEPs
Social Democratic Party (Portugal) politicians
1953 births